Berrimah may refer to:

 Berrimah, Northern Territory, suburb
 Electoral division of Berrimah
 Berrimah Power Station
 Berrimah Prison

See also
 Berrima (disambiguation)